The Last Guitar is a 2010 album from UK singer-songwriter Nick Harper.

Track listing 
 "One of the 38"
 "For You"
 "The Story of My Heart"
 "Ama Dablam"
 "Passing Chord"
 "Hey Bomb"
 "Freestyle"
 "Pop Fiction"
 "On"
 "Jim Crow Is Dead"
 "The Last Guitar"
 "Silly Daddy"

References

External links 
 

2010 albums
Nick Harper albums